International Draco Racing was a motorsport team. It was most well known for operating in the World Series by Renault, but had also taken part in Formula Opel Lotus, International Formula 3000 and Euro Formula 3000.

Career

Formula Opel Lotus Euroseries
Draco was founded in 1989 by Adriano and Nadia Morini, and entered the Formula Opel Lotus Euroseries. In its first year, the Italian takes Brazilian driver Eduar Neto to second place in F. Opel, with five wins. The team continued to be one of the most competitive in the series for the following years, winning the F. Opel championship in 1990 with Rubens Barrichello, 1991 with Pedro Lamy, 1993 with Patrick Crinelli and 1994 with Marco Campos (in 1992, Gualter Salles was second).

International Formula 3000
Draco stayed in Formula Opel until the championship's demise in 1996, but the year before Adriano Morini took his team to Formula 3000, creating the outfit specifically for Marco Campos. Morini took a gamble on the Brazilian driver's talent, but he ultimately lost it when 18-year-old Campos died in the race at Magny-Cours. Draco was never so successful in F3000, even with drivers such as Ricardo Zonta (in 1996) and Bruno Junqueira (in 1998) and left the series after the 1999 season.

Euro Formula 3000
In 2000, Draco moved down to the Italian F3000 Championship (now Euro 3000), for older 1996 cars. This proved to be the wisest move, as Felipe Massa completely dominated the series in 2001, taking the championship title, a performance repeated in 2003 with Augusto Farfus and 2004 with Nicky Pastorelli.

Formula Renault 3.5 Series
In 2005, Draco changed series, again, to the World Series by Renault, where their lead drivers Pastor Maldonado and Miloš Pavlović finished third in the 2006 and 2007 seasons. In 2008 the drivers was Bertrand Baguette and Marco Barba. In 2009 the Draco Team won the Formula Renault 3.5 Championship with the Team Title and the Driver Title with Bertrand Baguette. Following funding issues midway through the 2015 Formula Renault 3.5 Series season, the team closed down at the end of the year.

Complete Formula Renault 3.5 Series results
(key) (results in bold indicate pole position; results in italics indicate fastest lap)

Complete former series results

3000 Pro Series

Italian/Euro Formula 3000

International Formula 3000

Notes:
1. - Martini scored 3 points in 1 race for Sighinolfi Autoracing.
2. - Sauvage also entered in 4 races for Monaco Motorsport.

External links
 Draco Racing official website
 Draco Racing official website 
 Renault Sport official website
 

Italian auto racing teams
1989 establishments in Italy
World Series Formula V8 3.5 teams
International Formula 3000 teams
Auto racing teams established in 1989
Auto GP teams
2015 disestablishments in Italy
Auto racing teams disestablished in 2015